William Bowers (1916–1987) was an American reporter and screenwriter

Bill, Billy, or William Bowers may also refer to:

William W. Bowers (1834–1917), U.S. Representative from California
Billy Bowers, vocalist with The Blind Boys of Alabama
William Bowers (politician) (born 1952), American politician in South Carolina
Billy Bowers (1922–1996), American baseball outfielder 
Bill Bowers (born 1959), American mime artist
Julie Bowers (William Julius Bowers, 1926–1977), American baseball player

See also
William Bowers Bourn II (1857–1936), American entrepreneur
William Bower (disambiguation)